The 2014 TreatMyClot.com 300 was the fifth stock car race of the 2014 NASCAR Nationwide Series season, and the 18th iteration of the event. The race was held on Saturday, March 22, 2014, in Fontana, California, at Auto Club Speedway, a  permanent D-shaped oval racetrack. The race took the scheduled 150 laps to complete. On the final restart with 16 to go, Kyle Larson, driving for Turner Scott Motorsports, would hold off fierce charges from the field to win his first career NASCAR Nationwide Series win and his first of the season. To fill out the podium, Kevin Harvick, driving for JR Motorsports, and Kyle Busch, driving for Joe Gibbs Racing, would finish second and third, respectively.

Background 

Auto Club Speedway (formerly California Speedway) is a 2 miles (3.2 km), low-banked, D-shaped oval superspeedway in Fontana, California which has hosted NASCAR racing annually since 1997. It is also used for open wheel racing events. The racetrack is located near the former locations of Ontario Motor Speedway and Riverside International Raceway. The track is owned and operated by International Speedway Corporation and is the only track owned by ISC to have naming rights sold. The speedway is served by the nearby Interstate 10 and Interstate 15 freeways as well as a Metrolink station located behind the backstretch.

Entry list 

 (R) denotes rookie driver.
 (i) denotes driver who is ineligible for series driver points.

Practice

First practice 
The first practice session was held on Friday, March 21, at 1:40 PM PST. The session would last for 50 minutes.

Second and final practice 
The final practice session, sometimes referred to as Happy Hour, was held on Friday, March 21, at 3:00 PM PST. The session would last for one hour and 25 minutes.

Qualifying 
Qualifying was held on Saturday, March 22, at 10:40 AM PST. Since Auto Club Speedway is at least  in length, the qualifying system was a multi-car system that included three rounds. The first round was 25 minutes, where every driver would be able to set a lap within the 25 minutes. Then, the second round would consist of the fastest 24 cars in Round 1, and drivers would have 10 minutes to set a lap. Round 3 consisted of the fastest 12 drivers from Round 2, and the drivers would have 5 minutes to set a time. Whoever was fastest in Round 3 would win the pole.

No drivers would fail to qualify.

Full qualifying results 

*Time not available.

Race results

Standings after the race 

Drivers' Championship standings

Note: Only the first 10 positions are included for the driver standings.

References 

2014 NASCAR Nationwide Series
NASCAR races at Auto Club Speedway
March 2014 sports events in the United States
2014 in sports in California